Lester the Unlikely is a 1994 platform video game developed by Visual Concepts for the Super Nintendo Entertainment System (SNES).

Gameplay
The game has a unique engine in which the protagonist, Lester, is easily frightened early in the game and will act reluctantly when faced with animals, heights, etc.  For instance, when the player guides Lester towards a turtle in the first stage, he will at first scream and run in the opposite direction; when the player makes him walk towards it a second time he will slowly creep towards it. This coincides with one of the major themes of the game being Lester facing his fears, and these instances happen less and less as the game goes on. The game also has an item and weapon box, allowing Lester to hold both of these things.
The first part of the game depicts Lester as a very cowardly character. Every time he encounters a new creature, he runs away in the opposite direction with a scream (temporarily removing the controls from the player's hand). Upon approaching the creature a second time, Lester walks slowly, protecting himself with his arms. Once a certain type of creature has been defeated, the player will be able to walk to this type of creature without any further sign of fear. At the beginning of the game, Lester walks in a very lazy, laid-back stance, suggesting weakness and lack of courage. However, after saving an indigenous girl from a huge gorilla, the girl gives a kiss to the hero and he is suddenly changed. In the following levels, Lester has a very upright and courageous stance.

Plot

In the beginning, a teenage boy named Lester, who is "kind of geeky" and "kind of sleepy" recently got a new issue of the Super Duper Hero Squad comic book. He was reading it while walking on a dock, until he fell asleep next to a cargo crate lying beside a cargo ship. After he and the cargo were loaded onto the ship by a crane and cruised off, the ship got hijacked by pirates who scuttled it. Lester luckily found a life jacket and swam toward the most adjacent island while the cargo ship sank. Lester must find his way home by exploring the island for someone or something that can help him survive.

Development
Bill Stanton was the lead artist on the project and handled backgrounds, tiles, sprites and adapting rotoscope animations. Michel Bohbot created the cover art. Eric Browning, a lead artist for Visual Concepts (as well as the voice of Lester), acted as the rotoscope model for the lead character. Browning described it as "one of those games that starts out way too ambitious, and ends up merely adequate." Lester the Unlikely was one of six SNES games programmed by Brian Greenstone of Pangea Software. On the Pangea website, Greenstone wrote "Lester was a game I never liked. Don't wanna talk about it."

A conversion for the Atari Jaguar was in development and planned to be published by DTMC, but it was never released.

Critical reception

A review from Nintendo Power scored it a 3.7 out of 5, praising the animation that they noted similar to Prince of Persia and the difficulty. They did, however, dislike the limited number of continues for a game that would require the player to experiment a lot in order to beat the game.

Notes

References

External links
Lester the Unlikely at MobyGames
Lester the Unlikely at SNESMusic.org
Michel Bohbot Illustration at www.mbohbot.com

1994 video games
Asmik Ace Entertainment games
Cancelled Atari Jaguar games
DTMC games
Platform games
Super Nintendo Entertainment System games
Super Nintendo Entertainment System-only games
Video games developed in the United States
Video games with rotoscoped graphics
Video games about pirates
Video games set on fictional islands
Single-player video games